Somu Veerraju (born 15 October 1957) is a senior politician from the Indian state of Andhra Pradesh from Bharatiya Janata Party and is currently the President of BJP party for the state of Andhra Pradesh. He is MLC of Bharatiya Janata Party in Andhra Pradesh Legislative Council. He hails from farmer's family living in Rajahmundry City. Veeraju was President and secretary of Bharatiya Janata Yuva Morcha in the state. He was also general secretary and vice-president of state unit, BJP Floor leader in Legislative Council.

Biography

Early life 
Somu Veerraju was born on 15 Oct. 1957 in Rajahmundry. He was born to Somu Surya Rao and Gangamma.

Politics 

Somu Veerraju is currently the President BJP party for the state of Andhra Pradesh. He worked as ex- General Secretary & Vice President for BJP in Andhra Pradesh. Veeraju was President and secretary of Bharatiya Janata Yuva Morcha in the state. He was also general secretary and vice-president of state unit.

In 2015, he was selected by TDP as Member of Legislative Council. He is the Floor Leader for BJP in Legislative Council Andhra Pradesh.

 1978 : BJYM City Secretary.
 1980 : BJYM General Secretary East Godavari District.
 1987 : BJP General Secretary East Godavari District.
 1990 : BJYM General Secretary.
 1993-1994 : BJYM AP President.
 2003 : BJP Andhra Pradesh State Executive.
 2004 : BJP Andhra Pradesh Vice-President.
 2006-2013 : General Secretary BJP Andhra Pradesh.
 2013-2018 : BJP National Executive.
 2020 : BJP Andhra Pradesh President.

AS MEMBER OF LEGISLATIVE ASSEMBLY/COUNCIL
 2004: BJP MLA Candidate for Kadiam Assembly Constituency, East Godavari District
 2009: BJP Loksabha Candidate for Kakinada Parliament Constituency, East Godavari District
 2015: BJP Member of Legislative Council Andhra Pradesh.

Personal life 

Somu Veeraju is the youngest of his siblings with elder brother and sister. Somu Veeraju is survived by his wife and three daughters.

References

Living people
Bharatiya Janata Party politicians from Andhra Pradesh
Members of the Andhra Pradesh Legislative Assembly
Politicians from Rajahmundry
Members of the Andhra Pradesh Legislative Council
Telugu politicians
1957 births